The Freightliner Coronado is a Class 8 conventional truck, intended for long haul and vocational use. It was introduced in January 2001, with production starting for the 2002 model year. It featured Cummins, Caterpillar, and Detroit engine options. That generation was discontinued in 2010 to make way for a second; however, the first generation remains available as a glider, referred to as the 122SD.

References

Coronado
Class 8 trucks
Vehicles introduced in 2001
Tractor units